Marcos Daniel was the defending champion but decided not to participate.
Víctor Estrella won the final 6–7(2–7), 6–4, 6–4 against Alejandro Falla.

Seeds

Draw

Finals

Top half

Bottom half

References
 Main Draw
 Qualifying Draw

Seguros Bolívar Open Medellín - Singles
2011 Singles